Govindaswamy Lakshmanan (12 February 1924 - 10 January 2001) was an Indian politician belonging to the Dravida Munnetra Kazhagam party. He was elected to the Lower house of the Indian Parliament the Lok Sabha in 1980 from Chennai North. He had earlier represented Tamil Nadu in the Rajya Sabha, the upper house of the Indian Parliament from 1974 to 1980. He was the Deputy Speaker of the Lok Sabha from 1980 to 1984.

He died on January 10, 2001.

References

External links
 Official biographical sketch in Parliament of India website

Rajya Sabha members from Tamil Nadu
Dravida Munnetra Kazhagam politicians
Lok Sabha members from Tamil Nadu
India MPs 1980–1984
Deputy Speakers of the Lok Sabha
1924 births
2001 deaths